Ukrainian wedding is the traditional marriage ceremony in Ukrainian culture, both in Ukraine and in the Ukrainian diaspora. The traditional Ukrainian wedding featured a rich assortment of folk music and singing, dancing, and visual art, with rituals dating back to the pre-Christian era.  Over time, the ancient pagan traditions and symbols were integrated into Christian ones.

Traditional wedding rituals

Betrothal

Ivan Kupala Day – On the eve of the celebration of Ivan Kupala Day village folks would roam through the forests in search of paporot flower, an elusive and magical flower that brings great wealth. Unmarried women, wearing a Ukrainian wreath, would be the first to enter the forest. They are followed by young men. If the couple comes out with the young man wearing the girl's wreath, they are engaged to be married.

Paying the ransom – The groom must go to the bride's parents' house and offer a ransom to get his bride. The bridesmaids protect the bride from getting "stolen" without a ransom. First, the groom offers something valuable, usually money or jewellery for the bride. The parents of the bride bring out a woman or man dressed as the bride and covered with a veil, so the groom can't see her face. When the groom realizes that it is not his bride, he asks for his true love, and the family demands a bigger ransom because she is valuable. Once the ransom is negotiated, the bride's family offers the bride to the groom.

If the bride's parents meet the bridegroom at the door with a pumpkin, it means that his offer of marriage was not accepted by either the bride or by her family, and the pumpkin is something for him to carry, so that he doesn't leave empty-handed.

Blahoslovennia - This is a ritual blessing of the bride and groom by their parents. It usually takes place shortly before the wedding ceremony. The bride and bridegroom at their own homes with their parents and grandparents perform this ritual. When the bridegroom arrives at the bride's house, after he has paid ransom for his bride, the bride and bridegroom perform this ritual together, in front of both of their parents. In the combined blessing ceremony, the elder (starosta) first asks the couple's parents to sit on benches. Once seated, a long embroidered cloth, rushnyk is placed on their lap, and everyone is given a loaf of wedding bread. The starosta recites a ceremonial text such as the following: "As these two children stand before their own mother, before their own father, before their uncles, before their godparents; maybe they did not listen to one of you, I ask you to forgive them and bless them." In Ukrainian, the word proschannia is used to describe forgiving someone of their offenses as well as bidding them farewell. Then the family members repeat "Bih sviatyi" (May Holy God forgive and bless you) three times. The couple then bows to their parents and kisses their faces, hands, and feet. This blessing is performed three times.  This ritual symbolizes forgiveness for any sins, and a blessing of the marriage from the parents.

Ceremony

The couple steps up on a rushnyk before they take their vows. Traditionally, the one who steps on the towel first, will have the final say throughout their marriage.

During the crowning ceremony in a traditional wedding the bride's vinok is replaced by an ochipok and namitka that covers her hair and signifies that she is now married. The groom is also crowned with a hat, symbolic of him accepting responsibility as a man.

Vesellia
The wedding celebration can last days and sometimes weeks, with dancing, singing, long toasts, and a feast that includes the entire community.

Features
  Rushnyk - is a Ukrainian embroidered long ritual cloth. Rushnyks are very important part of the ceremony and have symbolic meaning. They are often part of the bride's dowry and have pairs of birds embroidered on them, representing the wedding couple.
  Svashky — is a woman's choir that sings during the wedding ceremony
  Korovai – is the ceremonial and symbolic wedding bread. Traditionally it was a large round braided bread, baked from wheat flour and decorated with symbolic flags and figurines, such as suns, moons, birds, animals, and pine cones. It was given to the bride and groom as a blessing.  
  Myrtle or periwinkle Crowns
  Bread and Salt
  Hand Fasting

Traditional songs
 Horila sosna, palala (Pine was burning, was in flames)
 Bdzholy (Bees, golden wings)
 Nese Halia vodu (Helen carries water)
 Byla mene maty (Mother was hitting me)
 Oy u vyshnevomu sadu (Hey, in a cherry garden)
 A kalyna ne verba (Yet guelder rose is not a willow)
 Oy na hori dva dubky (Hey, on the hill are two oaks)

Locations

 Church
 Civil

Funerals
Young women who die unmarried are buried in a wedding dress in some areas. The most followed religion in Ukraine is Eastern Orthodox and when it comes to funerals it has strict rules. The mourning period is very important and because it is believed that the soul of the person wanders the earth for 40 days, there are ceremonies that pay respect to the dead. It is believed that on the 3rd day the soul leaves the body, on the 9th day spirit leaves the body and on the 40th day the body starts to die as well. One of the most important and interesting parts of a Ukrainian funeral is the preparation of the body which includes washing the body to get rid of worldly sins, but this is mostly performed by the family and friends because in Ukrainian traditions the family has to take care of the loved one to the end. The next step is dressing the dead in clean, all white clothes as a symbol of purity. Then the body is placed in the casket in the family home and is let to rest for a few days. Next comes the wake which is done the night before the actual funeral and lasts the whole night. On this night friends and family gather in the house and mourn for the deceased.

Weddings in Literature
Natalka Poltavka is a Ukrainian play written by Ivan Kotlyarevsky.
Ukrainian Wedding was first performed in 1851, with Semen Hulak-Artemovsky in the role of the father-in-law.

References

External links
  Wedding at the Encyclopedia of Ukraine
  Wedding songs at the Encyclopedia of Ukraine
  Dr. Natalie Kononenko. Ukrainian Village Weddings; Collected in Central Ukraine, 1998 SEEFA Journal, vol.4, no.1 Spring 1999 pp. 65–72
  Wedding Traditions in Ukraine University of Alberta Museums
 Orysia Paszczak Tracz. Vesillia: Ukrainian weddings in Manitoba over the last century Part I. The Ukrainian Weekly, October 27, 2002.
  Orysia Paszczak Tracz. Vesillia: Ukrainian weddings in Manitoba over the last century Part II. The Ukrainian Weekly, November 3, 2002.
  Nancy Millar.  Once Upon a Wedding: Stories of Weddings in Western Canada, 1860-1945. Bayeux Arts, 2000. 
  Dzvinka Kachur. Traditional Hutsul wedding in Western Ukraine. Welcome to Ukraine magazine.
  Welcome to a wedding, Central Ukrainian style! Welcome to Ukraine magazine.

Ukrainian culture
Weddings by nationality
Ukrainian traditions